The International Coffee Agreement (ICA) is an international commodity agreement between coffee producing countries and consuming countries. First signed in 1962, it was originally aimed at maintaining exporting countries' quotas and keeping coffee prices high and stable in the market, mainly using export quotas to steer the price. The International Coffee Organization, the controlling body of the agreement, represents all major coffee producing countries and most consuming countries.

The current 2007 agreement has 42 exporting members and 7 importing (the European Union represents all its member states as one member).

History
The original agreement was signed in 1962 for a five-year period, and since then there have been six subsequent agreements, ratified in 1968, 1976, 1983, 1994, 2001 and 2007.

Background
The precursor to the ICA was the Inter-American Coffee Agreement (IACA) established during the Second World War. The war had created the conditions for a Latin American coffee agreement: European markets were closed off, the price of coffee was in decline and the United States feared that the declining price could drive Latin American countries—especially Brazil—towards Nazi or Communist sympathies.

In 1940, the United States agreed to restrict its imports to a quota of 15.9 million bags, and other Latin American countries agreed to restrict their production. The agreement had an immediate effect, the price almost doubled by the end of 1941. After the end of the war in 1945 the price of coffee rose continuously until 1955–57 when a degree of equilibrium was reached.

Producers sought ways to maintain the price, this led to the first International Coffee Agreement. A target price was set, and export quotas allocated to each producer. When the indicator price set by the International Coffee Organization (ICO) fell below the target price, quotas were decreased; if it rose above it, quotas were increased. Although the system had its problems, it was successful in raising and stabilizing the price.

The International Coffee Organization was established in 1963 to administer the clauses of the agreement and supervise the mechanisms in place. Until 1986 the Coffee Council, the decision-making body of ICO, approved export quotas.

Breakdown of the 1989 agreement
In 1989, ICO failed to reach an agreement on new export quotas, causing the 1983 ICA to break down. The disagreement was triggered by consumers' change in taste towards milder and higher quality coffee. With the retained quotas from the 1983 agreement, the change increased the value of milder coffee at the expense of more traditional varieties such as robusta. Brazil in particular – the world's most powerful coffee producer – refused to reduce its quotas believing it would lower their market share. The consumers, led by the United States, demanded higher quality coffee and the end of selling coffee to non-members at reduced rates.

The US criticized Brazil for not being willing to accept a reduction of the country's quotas despite falling share of the world market since 1980. Jorio Dauster, head of the state-controlled Brazilian Coffee Institute, described Brazil as an "extremely efficient producer" and believed it could survive without help from ICO.

The 1983 ICA was set to expire on 1 October 1989, but realizing that it would be impossible to enter into a new agreement before the termination date, the Coffee Council (ICO's highest body) effectively decided to suspend the export quotas on 4 July 1989. Without an extended agreement producing countries lost most of their influence on the international market. ICO's average indicator price for the last five years previous the end of the regime fell from US$1.34 per pound, to US$0.77 per pound for the first five years after.

According to Yves Engler's Canada in Africa, "no longer worried about the prospect of poor coffee producers turning towards the Soviet Union, the US withdrew its support from the International Coffee Agreement in 1989."

Members
The current 2007 ICA entered into force on 2 February 2011 when it was approved by two-thirds of the exporting and importing signatory governments. , it has 51 members, of which 44 are exporting members, and 7 importing (the European Union represents all its 28 member states). According to ICO, its members represent 98% of all coffee production and 67% of the consumption.

Exporting members (42)

Angola
Benin
Bolivia
Brazil
Burundi
Cameroon
Central African Republic
Colombia
Costa Rica
Ivory Coast
Cuba
Ecuador
El Salvador
Ethiopia
Gabon
Ghana
Guatemala
Guinea
Haiti
Honduras
India
Indonesia

Jamaica
Kenya
Liberia
Malawi
Mexico
Nicaragua
Panama
Papua New Guinea
Paraguay
Philippines
Rwanda
Sierra Leone
Tanzania
Thailand
East Timor
Togo
Uganda
Vietnam
Yemen
Zambia
Zimbabwe

Importing members (7)

Japan
Norway
Russian Federation
Switzerland
Tunisia
United Kingdom
United States of America
European Union:
Austria
Belgium
Bulgaria
Croatia
Cyprus
Czech Republic
Denmark
Estonia
Finland
France
Germany
Greece

European Union (continued):
Hungary
Ireland
Italy
Latvia
Lithuania
Luxembourg
Malta
Netherlands
Poland
Portugal
Romania
Slovakia
Slovenia
Spain
Sweden

United States Exits
The United States exited the International Coffee Agreement after a 90-day notification period ending 27 June 2018.

See also

Notes

References

External links
 Membership

Commercial treaties
International Coffee Agreement
United Nations treaties
Treaties concluded in 1962
Treaties entered into force in 1962
Treaties of Angola
Treaties of Bolivia
Treaties of Brazil
Treaties of Burundi
Treaties of Cameroon
Treaties of the Central African Republic
Treaties of Colombia
Treaties of Costa Rica
Treaties of Ivory Coast
Treaties of Cuba
Treaties of Ecuador
Treaties of El Salvador
Treaties of Ethiopia
Treaties of Gabon
Treaties of Ghana
Treaties of Guatemala
Treaties of Honduras
Treaties of India
Treaties of Indonesia
Treaties of Kenya
Treaties of Liberia
Treaties of Malawi
Treaties of Mexico
Treaties of Nicaragua
Treaties of Panama
Treaties of Papua New Guinea
Treaties of the Philippines
Treaties of Rwanda
Treaties of Sierra Leone
Treaties of Tanzania
Treaties of Thailand
Treaties of East Timor
Treaties of Togo
Treaties of Uganda
Treaties of Vietnam
Treaties of Yemen
Treaties of Zambia
Treaties of Zimbabwe
Treaties of Norway
Treaties of Switzerland
Treaties of Tunisia
Treaties of Turkey
Treaties of the United States
Treaties entered into by the European Union
Treaties of Benin
Treaties of Guinea
Treaties of Haiti
Treaties of Paraguay
Food treaties